Yiting Li is an economist.

Career
They are a Distinguished Professor at National Taiwan University.

In 2022 they were elected to the Academia Sinica.

References

Academic staff of the National Taiwan University
Members of Academia Sinica